Bleacher Creatures (founded 2011) is an American company producing plush figures of licensed personalities from sports and entertainment. The company has produced toys of over 1000 different figures, and also produces wigs, masks, and capes with licensed logos.

The company was founded in 2011 by Matthew Hoffman, a sports-licensed industry veteran, beginning with licensed plush likenesses of famous athletes marketed for children. Bleacher Creatures first player that they released was a  version of Philadelphia Phillies second baseman Chase Utley.

The company holds licensing deals with companies including the National Football League, National Basketball Association, World Wrestling Entertainment, Marvel Comics, DC Comics, Warner Brothers, and MGM Studios. Their products have global distribution, and plush figure sales in excess of three million units.

References

External links

Philadelphia Inquirer, 12/8/2014, Bleacher Creatures enjoying plush life with mini-versions of athletes, Author Diane Mastrull
License Magazine, 11/17/2014,NFLPI Highlights Bleacher Creatures
Licensing Magazine, 9/12/2014, DC Comics Characters Get Plush Line
Azdailysun.com
Comicbook.com
Toynews-online.biz
Businessnewsdaily.com

Toy companies of the United States
Toy companies established in 2011
Sports memorabilia
American companies established in 2011